Talupulamma Temple is a pilgrimage site located in Lova of Kakinada district in Andhra Pradesh, India. The presiding deity is a gramadevatha known as Talupulamma Thalli (lit. Goddess who grants wishes). It is located between two heavily forested hillocks Darakonda and Teegakonda near the town of Tuni and has views of the valley. The temple is situated 65 km from Kakinada, 90 km from Visakhapatnam, and 100 km from Rajamahendravaram. The temple is also close to the Vaishnavite temple town of Annavaram (20 km).

Poojas and Festivals 
The primary festival of the temple is the annual Jatara and the Ashada Masa Utsavams. The annual Jatara is celebrated from Chaitra Bahula Vidiya to Chaitra Bahula Amavasya for 15 days. Ashada Masa Utsavams are celebrated from Ashada Suddha Padyami to Ashada Bahula Amavasya every year. The temple follows Grama Devatha Agamas.

Gallery

References 

Hindu temples in Kakinada district